Spring Branch is a stream in Jackson County in the U.S. state of Missouri. It is a tributary of the Little Blue River.
 
Spring Branch was named for the fact a spring flows into its headwaters.

See also
List of rivers of Missouri

References

Rivers of Jackson County, Missouri
Rivers of Missouri